Theodore Judd Serios (November 27, 1918 – December 30, 2006) was a Chicago bellhop known for his production of "thoughtographs" on Polaroid film. He claimed these were produced using psychic powers. Serios's psychic claims were bolstered by the endorsement of a Denver-based psychiatrist, Jule Eisenbud (1908–1999), who published a book named The World of Ted Serios: "Thoughtographic" Studies of an Extraordinary Mind (1967) arguing that Serios's purported psychic abilities were genuine. However, professional photographers and skeptics have argued that Serios and his photographs were fraudulent.

History and method 

Serios was an unemployed bellhop when his claims that he had the ability to put images on film with his mind came to the attention of Jule Eisenbud. He was tested by Eisenbud at Denver during a period of three years. Serios usually held a small cylinder or tube he called a "gizmo" up to the lens of an instant camera, which was then pointed at his forehead and the shutter released. He would often be drunk, or at least have been drinking, when he produced his photographs.

Serios's images were most often blank or black. Occasionally, a fuzzy image would be seen that could be interpreted in many different ways (cf. pareidolia), but on rare occasions a relatively clear and identifiable image showed up although often appearing surrounded by dark areas on the film. On some occasions, his photos appeared to be distorted, or altered versions of real places or images, e.g., one such photo seemed to be of Eisenbud's ranch showing the barn as a different structure to the reality. Another photograph depicted part of a building identified later as a hangar belonging to the Air Division of the Royal Canadian Mounted Police. Eisenbud attempted to prove that previously unidentified photographs were actually of the surface of Ganymede. In Eisenbud's own words, "Unfortunately, I couldn't get an astronomer or optical scientist to agree."

Psychology 

According to Eisenbud, "Ted Serios exhibits a behavior pathology with many character disorders. He does not abide by the laws and customs of our society. He ignores social amenities and has been arrested many times. His psychopathic and sociopathic personality manifests itself in many other ways. He does not exhibit self-control and will blubber, wail and bang his head on the floor when things are not going his way." Serios was described as an alcoholic.

Critical reception 

In an article in the October 1967 issue of the magazine Popular Photography, Charlie Reynolds and David Eisendrath, both amateur magicians and professional photographers, claimed to have exposed Serios as a fraud after spending a week-end with him and Eisenbud. Reynolds and Eisendrath said they spotted Serios slipping something into the tube that Serios claimed he needed to help him concentrate. They surmised this was a picture of something that the camera would take an image of, but which Serios would claim came from his mind rather than his hand. Robert Todd Carroll later wrote "after the exposure he remained virtually unheard from for the past 30 years."

In 1968, W. A. H. Rushton, a professor of physiology and president of the Society for Psychical Research, rejected any paranormal interpretation of the photographs. He suggested that it was light that formed the photographs from a luminous picture placed in front of the camera lens hidden in the 'gizmo'. Rushton successfully replicated the Serios phenomenon by holding a little reflecting prism that contained a microfilm picture against the camera lens.

James Randi, stage magician and noted scientific sceptic, took an interest in investigating Serios. Randi claimed Serios used "a simple handheld optical device" to perform his photographic trickery. Randi wrote he replicated the trick of Serios on a live television show in New York and Eisenbud was "flabbergasted". According to Terence Hines:

Serios would use what he called a "gizmo," a tube of paper placed against the camera lens. He said this helped him to focus his mental energy and direct it toward the film. He also used something he didn't tell anyone about—a tiny tube about one inch long and one-half inch in diameter. This tube had a tiny magnifying lens at one end. In the other end one could insert a piece cut from a standard 35mm slide. Lined up properly, this device projected the image on the cut piece of transparency onto the film of the Polaroid camera. The device was small enough to be concealed in the palm of the hand, so it could be used even when the larger paper "gizmo" wasn't around to conceal it.

In an article in New Scientist titled "The Chance of a Lifetime" (24 March 2007), an interview appears with the noted mathematician and magician Persi Diaconis. During the interview Diaconis mentioned that Martin Gardner had paid him to watch Ted Serios perform, during which Diaconis claimed that he caught Serios sneaking a small marble with a photograph on it into the little tube attached to the front of the camera he used. "It was," Diaconis said, "a trick." Gardner wrote that "the parapsychologists who once took Ted Serios and others like him seriously would have been spared their embarrassments had they known anything about magic."

Popular culture 

Thoughtography was the premise of The X-files 1996 episode "Unruhe". The X-Files producer Chris Carter signed a deal to base a film on Dr. Eisenbud's book. Serios was also featured and interviewed in an episode of Arthur C. Clarke's World of Strange Powers in 1985. Serios was earlier featured in the television series In Search of... in the episode "Ghosts In Photography" in 1980.

Ted Serios and thoughtography were highlighted in a 2014 episode of Mysteries at the Museum (Season 6, Episode 13).

Ted Serios is one of the mediums in French author 's 2014 novel Descente de médiums.

See also 
Chizuko Mifune

References

Further reading 
Jule Eisenbud. (1967). The World of Ted Serios: "Thoughtographic" Studies of an Extraordinary Mind. Morrow 
Colin Brookes-Smith. (1968). Review of The World of Ted Serios by J. Eisenbud. Journal of the Society for Psychical Research 44: 260-265.
Milbourne Christopher. (1975). Mediums, Mystics & the Occult. Thomas Y. Crowell. 
Henry Gordon. (1988). Extrasensory Deception: ESP, Psychics, Shirley MacLaine, Ghosts, UFOs. MacMillan Of Canada. 
Curtis D. MacDougall. (1983). Superstition and the Press. Prometheus Books. 
James Randi. (1982). Flim-Flam! Psychics, ESP, Unicorns, and Other Delusions. Prometheus Books.  
W. A. H. Rushton. (1968). Serios Photos: If Contrary to Natural Law, Which Law? Journal of the Society for Psychical Research 44: 289-293.
John Sladek. (1974). The New Apocrypha: A Guide to Strange Science and Occult Beliefs. Stein and Day. 
Gordon Stein. (1993). Encyclopedia of Hoaxes. Gale Group. 
Romeo Grünfelder (ed.),  Peter Geimer, Philippe Dubois & Bernd Stiegler. (2016). Ted Serios - Serien. (German translation of Jule Eisenbud collection on Ted Serios and thoughtographic photography from 1975 with additional pictures of the Polaroids).  Textem Verlag.

External links 
Jule Eisenbud collection on Ted Serios and thoughtographic photography, 1931–2001, bulk 1964–1989 at the University of Maryland, Baltimore County.
Psychic Projections Were a Hoax by Len Peyronnin
Thoughtography by Nile Root
Thoughtography entry in The Skeptic's Dictionary.

1918 births
2006 deaths
American fraudsters
American psychics
Paranormal hoaxes
Psychokineticists
People from Chicago
Hoaxes in the United States
20th-century hoaxes